Crosley Radio is an audio electronic manufacturing company headquartered in Louisville, Kentucky. It is a modern incarnation of the original Crosley Corporation which existed from 1921 to 1956. Modern Marketing Concepts resurrected the Crosley name after the original brand was discontinued by parent company Avco in 1956, due to declining sales. The modern Crosley first marketed turntables in 1992. Today, Crosley is a marketer of turntables, as well as radios and jukeboxes.

In 2017, Crosley introduced the 'Vinyl Rocket' – not only the first vinyl jukebox in its catalog, but also the "world's only vinyl jukebox in current production". The machine holds up to 70 seven-inch records, and can play both A and B sides thanks to what the company calls a “unique rotating vinyl mechanism” for a total of 140 possible selections.

External links

References

Companies based in Louisville, Kentucky
Electronics companies established in 1984
1984 establishments in Kentucky
American companies established in 1984
Audio equipment manufacturers of the United States
Phonograph manufacturers
Radio manufacturers